SP3 may refer to:

 sp3 hybrids, a type of orbital hybridisation
 Sp3 transcription factor, a protein and the gene which encodes it
 Savoia-Pomilio SP.3, a reconnaissance and bomber aircraft built in Italy
 , an armed motorboat
 1971 SP3 or 3922 Heather, a main-belt asteroid discovered on September 26, 1971
 1984 SP3 or 3155 Lee, a main-belt asteroid discovered on September 28, 1984
 SP3, a model of steam toy made by British manufacturer Mamod
 Service pack 3, for computer software
 Socket SP3, a CPU socket for AMD processors
 SP3, a sink in the Sima Pumacocha, a cave in Peru
 Surface Pro 3, a 2-in-1 personal computer by Microsoft